Vladimir Burduli (born 26 October 1980) is a Georgian football manager and a former player. He is the manager of Meshakhte Tkibuli.

Playing career
He has been capped 21 times for the national team, scoring 2 goals.

He left for Russian side FC Alania Vladikavkaz in 2005.

Career statistics

International goals

Honours

Player
Dinamo Tbilisi
Georgian Premier League (3): 1997–98, 1998–99, 2002–03
Georgian Cup (2): 2002–03, 2003–04

Lokomotivi Tbilisi
Georgian Cup (1): 2004–05

References

External links

Footballers from Georgia (country)
Expatriate footballers from Georgia (country)
Georgia (country) international footballers
FC Dinamo Tbilisi players
FC Spartak Vladikavkaz players
SC Tavriya Simferopol players
FC Kryvbas Kryvyi Rih players
FC Zorya Luhansk players
FC Hoverla Uzhhorod players
Russian Premier League players
Ukrainian Premier League players
Expatriate footballers in Russia
Expatriate footballers in Ukraine
Expatriate sportspeople from Georgia (country) in Ukraine
1980 births
Living people
Footballers from Tbilisi
Association football midfielders
Expatriate sportspeople from Georgia (country) in Azerbaijan
Football managers from Georgia (country)